Juan Andres Castilla Lozano (born July 27, 2004) is a Colombian professional footballer who plays as a midfielder for the Houston Dynamo in Major League Soccer.

Career

Youth 
Castilla joined the Houston Dynamo pre-academy teams when he was 7. In 2016, at the age of 11, he moved to the Dynamo Academy. He spent some time training in Spain and with the Columbus Crew Academy before returning to the Dynamo in 2019.

Professional

Houston Dynamo
On 14 June 2020, Castilla signed a Homegrown contract with the Houston Dynamo. The contract went into effect on 1 January 2021. At 15 years old, Castilla became the youngest homegrown signing in club history. He spent the rest of 2020 with Houston's USL Championship affiliate, RGVFC. He made his professional debut on 31 October 2021, coming on as late substitute for Memo Rodríguez in a 1–0 home defeat to the Colorado Rapids. Castilla ended the 2021 season with 2 appearances.

During the 2022 season, Castilla primarily played with Houston Dynamo 2 in MLS Next Pro, where he had 1 goal and 4 assists in 17 appearances.  His one first team appearance of the season was a substitute appearance in the Open Cup.

Career statistics

Club

Personal life 
Castilla was born in Cali, Colombia.  When he was 3, his family moved to Houston, Texas.

References

External links
Juan Castilla at Major League Soccer

2004 births
Living people
Footballers from Cali
Colombian footballers
Colombia youth international footballers
American soccer players
United States men's youth international soccer players
Colombian emigrants to the United States
Houston Dynamo FC players
Major League Soccer players
Association football forwards
MLS Next Pro players